Cyril Harry Brine (born 6 February 1918 in Borehamwood, Hertfordshire, England – died 1988) was an international speedway who qualified for the Speedway World Championship finals twice.

Career summary
Brine began speedway racing in 1938. He initially rode at the training track at Rye House. Brine spent his entire career with one club, the Wimbledon Dons, where he made over 460 league appearances and scored over 2700 points, a club record. In his seventeen-season career with the Dons, he won the National League Championship seven times and the National Trophy seven times.

Brine made his debut for England in 1949. He retired from speedway in early 1963.

Elder brother Percy also rode.

World final appearances
 1950 –  London, Wembley Stadium – 9th – 7pts
 1951 –  London, Wembley Stadium – 13th – 3pts

References

1918 births
1988 deaths
British speedway riders
English motorcycle racers
Wimbledon Dons riders
People from Borehamwood